Arkadiusz Gołaś (10 May 1981 – 16 September 2005)  was a Polish volleyball player, member of the Poland men's national volleyball team in 2001–2005, participant of the Olympic Games (Athens 2004).

Personal life
He married Agnieszka (née Dziewońska) on July 21, 2005. His best man was another volleyball player, his best friend Krzysztof Ignaczak. On September 16, 2005 Arkadiusz died in Griffen, Austria near Klagenfurt in Austria on the A2 motorway when the car he was riding in struck a concrete wall. His wife, Agnieszka, who was driving, survived. They were on their way to Macerata, where Arkadiusz was due to begin playing his first season at the club Lube Banca Macerata. His last match with the Polish national team was on September 8, 2005, when Poland beat Portugal (3-0). His funeral held on September 22, 2005 in Ostrołęka.

Sports achievements

Clubs

National championships
 2000/2001  Polish Championship, with AZS Częstochowa
 2001/2002  Polish Championship, with AZS Częstochowa
 2002/2003  Polish Championship, with AZS Częstochowa
 2003/2004  Polish Championship, with AZS Częstochowa

National team
 1999  FIVB U19 World Championship

State awards
 2006  Gold Cross of Merit (posthumously)

Memory
 After his death, his best friend from the Polish national team - Krzysztof Ignaczak took over wearing his shirt, bearing number 16, to honor his memory.
 The silver medal won by the Polish national team at the World Championship 2006 was dedicated to him. At the medal ceremony, all Polish players were wearing shirts with his surname and number (16). On December 6, 2006, he was posthumously awarded Gold Cross of Merit by the Polish President Lech Kaczyński for outstanding sports achievements.
 A sport hall in Ostrołęka has been named after him. Since 2006, it has been the venue for the annual Memorial of Arkadiusz Gołaś.
 Sebastian Świderski, who was a player in Italian club Lube Banca Macerata in 2007–2010 played with Arkadiusz's number 16 on his shirt.
 In 2009, the son of Mariusz Wlazły was named after him.
 In 2013–2015, the Polish volleyball player – Bartosz Kurek has been playing with Gołaś's number 16 on his shirt.
 After gaining the title of World Champion 2014, Mariusz Wlazły dedicated his medal to him.

References

External links

 
 
 
 Player profile at LegaVolley.it 
 Player profile at PlusLiga.pl 
 Player profile at Volleybox.net 

1981 births
2005 deaths
Road incident deaths in Austria
People from Przasnysz County
Sportspeople from Masovian Voivodeship
Polish men's volleyball players
Olympic volleyball players of Poland
Volleyball players at the 2004 Summer Olympics
Polish expatriate sportspeople in Italy
Expatriate volleyball players in Italy
AZS Częstochowa players
Middle blockers